The Royal Military Canal Path is a long-distance path in England, mainly following the Royal Military Canal. It is a canal-side path and fringes the northern edge of Romney Marsh. The canal is an early-19th-century defence against a possible invasion by Napoleon, and it is a Scheduled Ancient Monument and a SSSI. Links are made with the Saxon Shore Way at Appledore and West Hythe.

See also
 Greensand Way

References

Long-distance footpaths in England
Footpaths in Kent
Footpaths in East Sussex